Fred Fish (November 4, 1952 – April 20, 2007) was a computer programmer notable for work on the GNU Debugger and his series of freeware Fish disks for the Amiga. The Fish Disks (term coined by Perry Kivolowitz at a Jersey Amiga User Group meeting) became the first national rallying point, a sort of early postal system. Fish would get his disks off around the world in time for regional and local user group meetings who in turn duplicated them for local consumption. Typically, only the cost of materials changed hands. The Fish Disk series ran from 1986 to 1994. In it, one can chart the growing sophistication of Amiga software and see the emergence of many software trends.

The Fish Disks were distributed at computer stores and Amiga enthusiast clubs. Contributors submitted applications and source code and the best of these each month were assembled and released as a diskette.  Since the Internet was not yet in popular usage outside military and university circles, this was a primary way for enthusiasts to share work and ideas. He also initiated the "GeekGadgets" project, a GNU standard environment for AmigaOS and BeOS.

Fish worked for Cygnus Solutions in the 1990s before he left for Be Inc. in 1998.

In 1978, he self-published User Survival Guide for TI-58/59 Master Library, which was advertised in enthusiast newsletters covering the TI-59 programmable calculator.

Personal life

Fred Fish was married to Michelle Fish (née Norman) at the time of his death. Fred Fish died at his home in Idaho on Friday April 20, 2007 of a heart attack.

References

External links

 Searchable database of Fish disk Amiga PD software
 Fish Disks
 
 Announcement of first Fish disks
 
  - research in progress, explicitly welcomes Wiki usage.

Computer programmers
Amiga people
1952 births
2007 deaths
Place of birth missing